2015 Liga Dominicana de Fútbol
Club Barcelona Atlético (Santo Domingo)
Bauger FC (Santo Domingo)
Club Atlético Pantoja (Santo Domingo)
Atlético Vega Real (La Vega)
Moca FC (Moca)
Cibao FC (Santiago de los Caballeros)
Atlético San Cristóbal (San Cristóbal)
O&M FC (Santo Domingo)
Delfines del Este FC (La Romana)
Atlántico FC (Puerto Plata)
TEC-FC (Santo Domingo)
CD Domingo Salvio (La Vega)
Don Bosco Jarabacoa FC (Jarabacoa)
Inter de Bayaguana (Bayaguana)
Leones De Alma Rosa FC (Santo Domingo)
Universidad O&M FC (Santo Domingo)
Romana FC (La Romana)
Bob Soccer School FC (Santo Domingo)
Atlético de San Francisco (San Francisco de Macorís)

Dominican Republic
 
Football Clubs
Football clubs